Nutty Buddy, formerly known as Nutty Bars in the United States, are a snack manufactured by McKee Foods under the brand title of Little Debbie since 1964. The snack consists of four wafers sandwiched together in a peanut butter mixture and covered with a cocoa coating (real chocolate will list either one ingredient called "chocolate liquor", or more likely its two components as separate ingredients called "cocoa" and "cocoa butter". The bars list cocoa among ingredients but substitute other fats for cocoa butter.). The packages generally come in sealed packs of 2 wafers. A serving size (57g), has 310 calories, 18g of fat with 8g of it being saturated fat, and 20g of sugar. They are now referred to as Nutty Buddy due to a name change.

McKee Foods/Little Debbie also makes another snack similar to these, which are known as Peanut Butter Crunch Bars.

References

External links 
 

Brand name cookies
Chocolate bars
McKee Foods brands
Cookie sandwiches